Mohammed Kozbar (محمد كزبر) is a trustee and general secretary of the Finsbury Park Mosque. He is also the vice president of the Muslim Association of Britain (MAB).

Finsbury Park Mosque

Kozbar is chairman of the Finsbury Park mosque.

References

Lebanese emigrants to the United Arab Emirates
Islam in the United Kingdom
Living people
Arabs in the United Kingdom
Year of birth missing (living people)